Nunamaker is a surname. Notable people with the surname include:

Homer Nunamaker (1889–1964), American politician
Jay Nunamaker (born 1937), American academic
Julian Nunamaker (1946–1995), American football player
Les Nunamaker (1889–1938), American baseball player